The 1948 Houston Cougars football team was an American football team that represented the University of Houston as a member of the Lone Star Conference (LSC) during the 1948 college football season. In its first season under head coach Clyde Lee, the team compiled a 5–6 record (3–4 against LSC opponents) and finished in the fourth place in the conference. Cecil Towns and Jack Gwin were the team captains. The team played its home games at Public School Stadium in Houston.

Schedule

References

Houston
Houston Cougars football seasons
Houston Cougars football